"God, If You Are Above..." is the first single from Falling in Reverse's third album Just Like You. It was released on December 15, 2014.

Background
The song was released on the same day of Ronnie Radke's birthday. The lyrics talk about Ronnie who begins to question God with his fear that the whole world will disappear one day, before wondering that if he does, he will have lived his life the way he should.

Personnel
Falling in Reverse
 Ronnie Radke – lead vocals
 Jacky Vincent – lead guitar, backing vocals
 Derek Jones – rhythm guitar, backing vocals
 Ryan Seaman – drums, percussion, backing vocals

Additional
 Charles Kallaghan Massabo – bass

Charts

References

External links
"God, If You Are Above..." music video at YouTube

2014 songs
2014 singles
Falling in Reverse songs
Songs written by Ronnie Radke
Songs written by Michael Baskette
Epitaph Records singles